This is a list of submissions to the 67th Academy Awards for Best Foreign Language Film. The Academy Award for Best Foreign Language Film was created in 1956 by the Academy of Motion Picture Arts and Sciences to honour non-English-speaking films produced outside the United States. The award is handed out annually, and is accepted by the winning film's director, although it is considered an award for the submitting country as a whole. Countries are invited by the Academy to submit their best films for competition according to strict rules, with only one film being accepted from each country.

For the 67th Academy Awards, forty-six films were submitted in the category Academy Award for Best Foreign Language Film. The submission deadline was set on November 1, 1994. Belarus, Bosnia and Herzegovina, Cambodia, Guatemala, Macedonia and Serbia submitted films to the competition for the first time. Also for the first time, films from both the Czech Republic and Slovakia competed against each other, although neither was nominated. Polish director Krzysztof Kieślowski originally had two films in the race when Poland and Switzerland entered two of his Three Colors trilogy. Switzerland's Red was disqualified, however, Poland's White screened alongside the other films, but did not make the final five. It was also the first time that all five of the successor states of the former Yugoslavia all entered the race separately. The bolded titles were the five nominated films, which came from Belgium, Cuba, Macedonia, Taiwan and the eventual winner, Burnt by the Sun, from Russia.

Submissions

Notes

  Switzerland's Red was disqualified in a controversial Academy ruling which determined that although Red was co-produced by the Swiss national film board and although it took place in Switzerland and featured a largely Swiss cast, it qualified as a majority French, and not Swiss, production. Miramax Films appealed to the Academy to change its mind, but to no avail; Switzerland declined to send another film. However, it was eligible in other categories and received three nominations: Best Director; Best Cinematography and Best Original Screenplay.

References

67